Ivana Dulić-Marković (born 13 June 1961) is a Serbian politician.

Career
Dulić-Marković was the Serbian Minister of Agriculture, Forestry, and Water Management from 2004 to 2006. In June 2006 she was appointed the Deputy Prime Minister in the Government of Serbia replacing Miroljub Labus. 

She is a member of the G17 Plus party. She graduated with a Ph.D. from Belgrade University in biotechnology in 1999, and was a teaching assistant at the faculty of biology. Outside her government career, she is a professor at the agricultural faculty at the University of Banja Luka.

Personal life
She has two children by her late husband. She is an ethnic Croat.

References

1961 births
Living people
Deputy Prime Ministers of Serbia
Politicians from Zagreb
Croats of Serbia
Serbian Roman Catholics
G17 Plus politicians
Members of the Executive Council of Vojvodina
Government ministers of Vojvodina
University of Belgrade Faculty of Agriculture alumni
Government ministers of Serbia
Academic staff of the University of Banja Luka
Croatian emigrants to Serbia
Women government ministers of Serbia
21st-century Serbian women politicians
21st-century Serbian politicians